Eloise Harriet Stannard (1829–1915) was a British 19th century painter known for her still life work. She was one of only two notable women artists associated with the Norwich School of painters, Britain's first provincial art movement.

Biography
Eloise Harriet Stannard was born in Norwich, Norfolk, on 1 February 1829, and christened on 12 February at St Peter Parmentergate, Norwich. She was one of the fourteen children of landscape painter and drawing teacher Alfred Stannard and Martha Stannard (née Sparks). Her uncle was the painter Joseph Stannard; both her father and her uncle were members of the Norwich School of painters, Britain's first provincial art movement. Eloise and her aunt Emily Coppin Stannard (Joseph's wife) would become the only two notable women artists associated with the Norwich School.

Stannard was probably trained as an artist by her father, and her style was influenced by traditional Dutch still life painting, especially the artist Jan van Huysum. Her subjects were mainly fruits—particularly fruits not grown in England—piled in baskets and bowls, set against a monochrome background in natural light and sometimes accented with small insects. Her fine brushwork and multiple paint layers produced a characteristically luminous surface. Stannard is today considered one of Britain's most gifted still life painters.In his book on East Anglian painters, Harold A.E. Day summed up her achievement as follows: 

Stannard suffered from poor health but still maintained an active career as a painter, exhibiting regularly and becoming so successful that she never needed to take in pupils, as was often the case for women artists in the 19th century. She began exhibiting in 1852, showing at the British Institution (1852–1867), the Royal Academy of Art (1856–1893), the Royal Society of British Artists (1856), and the Royal Glasgow Institute (1861). In 1859, the Art Journal praised her work exhibited at the Royal Academy that year with the following comment 

In 1857, she received a tribute written by George Nicol, Secretary of the British Institution, who wrote, 
In 1871 Eloise Stannard received an invitation from the Committee of the Female School of Arts, which asked her to be a judge for the school. Her poor health prevented her from accepting the invitation. 

She became a member of the Society of Women Artists in 1871. After 1873, when in the wake of her mother's death she assumed extra family responsibilities, her paintings became smaller and her exhibition career declined.

One of her paintings, Strawberries in a Glass Lid with Glass Bowl of Raspberries Behind (1896), hangs at Norwich Castle, which has the largest collection of works by Norwich School artists.

References

Further reading
 Day, Harold A. E. The Norwich School of Painters. Eastbourne Fine Arts, 1979.

External links

Works by Eloise Harriet Stannard in the Norfolk Museums Collections
Auction Sale
 

1829 births
1915 deaths
19th-century English painters
19th-century English women artists
20th-century English painters
20th-century English women artists
British still life painters
Artists from Norwich
English women painters
Sibling artists